Robert Willis, also known as rej_ex, is an American hacker and comic book writer. Willis is known for his work with the Sakura Samurai white-hat hacking group, and his contributions to the Wiley Tribe of Hackers book series. In 2015, he helped build a platform and strategy for news syndication which would ultimately be used to promote the candidacy of Donald Trump against Hillary Clinton; the pieces would reach over 30 million people a week prior to the 2016 election.

Early life 
Willis was born in Stamford, Connecticut, and raised by his mother and her family, who had immigrated to the United States from Italy.

Willis became interested in computers at a young age and identified the movies Hackers and The Matrix as contributors to his interest in hacking.

Career

Hacking 
Willis has worked in offensive security and red teaming for the military, later receiving a Texas Medal of Merit for his cybersecurity work. He was also employed for a time at Threatcare, a cyberattack simulation company. As of 2020, Willis was a managing member of 1337, Inc., a defensive cybersecurity company based in Austin, Texas. He is also a member of the Sakura Samurai hacking group. Through his work with Sakura Samurai, Willis has been involved in discovering security issues affecting Indian governmental groups, the Fermilab particle physics laboratory, Ford, and John Deere. 

Willis has been featured in the Wiley publications Tribe of Hackers: Cybersecurity Advice from the Best Hackers in the World, Tribe of Hackers Red Team: Tribal Knowledge from the Best in Offensive Cybersecurity, and Tribe of Hackers Blue Team: Tribal Knowledge from the Best in Defensive Cybersecurity.

Hacker X
In October 2021, Willis revealed in an Ars Technica profile that he was "Hacker X", a previously anonymous individual described by Theresa Payton in her 2020 book, Manipulated: Inside the Cyberwar to Hijack Elections and Distort the Truth.

Comic books 
Willis’s first comic series was called Paraneon, which included three titles: The Hive Network, Neon Skyline, and Portals. The books were originally launched as a Kickstarter, eventually raising over 300% of the original funding goal. In 2021, Willis obtained the trademark for Gold Key Comics.

Political activism 
Willis has said he identifies as socially liberal and fiscally conservative.

Bibliography

Wiley Publishing 
 Tribe of Hackers: Cybersecurity Advice from the Best Hackers in the World (contributing writer, August 2019)
 Tribe of Hackers Red Team: Tribal Knowledge from the Best in Offensive Cybersecurity (contributing writer, August 2019)
 Tribe of Hackers Blue Team: Tribal Knowledge from the Best in Defensive Cybersecurity (contributing writer, September 2020)
 Corporate Cybersecurity: Identifying Risks and the Bug Bounty Program (forward, December 2021)

Afterlife Comics 
 Neon Skyline (writer, letterer, artist, March 2021)
 The Hive Network (writer, colorist, letterer, artist, March 2021)
 Portals (writer, March 2021)
 Initiating ...Paraneon (writer, colorist, letterer, April 2021)

References

External links 
 

21st-century American male writers
21st-century American writers
American comics artists
American comics creators
American comics writers
Ethical hackers
Living people
People from Stamford, Connecticut
Sakura Samurai
Year of birth missing (living people)